Suburban Noize Records, also known as "Subnoize", is an independent record label based in Burbank, California, specializing in punk rock and underground hip hop. The label was founded in 1997 by Kevin Zinger and Kottonmouth Kings vocalist Brad Xavier.

Catalog

Upcoming album releases

Filmography

References

External links
 Suburban Noize Records Official Site
 

Suburban Noize Records albums
Hip hop discographies
Punk rock discographies
Record label discographies